The Fenneregg is a peak of the Rieserferner group on the border between Tyrol, Austria, and South Tyrol, Italy.

References 
Walter Mair: Osttiroler Wanderbuch. Tyrolia, Innsbruck 20057,

External links 

Mountains of the Alps
Mountains of Tyrol (state)
Mountains of South Tyrol
Alpine three-thousanders
Rieserferner Group
Austria–Italy border
International mountains of Europe
Rieserferner-Ahrn Nature Park
Geography of East Tyrol